Marie Meurdrac ( 1610 – 1680) was a French chemist and alchemist known for writing La Chymie Charitable et Facile, en Faveur des Dames [Easy Chemistry for Women], a treatise on chemistry aimed at common women. It is through this book that her name has survived to the present day, and scholars have argued that this was the first work on chemistry or alchemy by a woman since that of Maria the Jewess in the late classical period. Historian Lucia Tosi described Meurdrac as the first woman to publish a book on early chemistry. Though she was reluctant to write, concerned about criticism from those who didn't believe women should receive an education, she was a proto-feminist, and believed that "minds have no sex."

Personal life
Meurdrac was born into a landowning family in Mandres-les-Roses, today a suburb of Paris. Her father was Vincent Meurdrac (d. 1650), a local notary, and her mother was Elisabeth Dovet (d. 1636). She had a younger sister, Madame de La Guette, born Catherine Meurdrac (1613-1676), who later authored Memiors. As a child, Meurdrac was more serious than her younger sister, and she served as godmother to several children in her village. In 1625, when she was about 15, she married Henri de Vibrac, commander of Charles de Valois's guard unit. She moved to the Château de Grosbois where she came to know the Countess de Guiche, wife of Armand de Gramont, Comte de Guiche. The pair became very good friends, and Meurdrac would later dedicate her chemistry treatise to the Countess.

Education and career
Meurdrac was self-taught, and learned chemistry using works and experiments from other scientists and by reading theoretical works on alchemy and chemistry. In her studies, she covered items such as lab techniques, properties of medicines, and cosmetics. In her work, she also had a table of weights and 106 alchemical symbols that were used in medicine at the time. Meurdrac had her own laboratory, where she performed experiments with the aim of improving the lives of women, producing home remedies and beauty products, and recording her recipes diligently. She also offered to teach private lessons to women in her own laboratory, if they were not confident enough to experiment on their own. Meurdrac had access to a high temperature furnace that she used for her experiments, unusual for the time, as it required special permission from the king. This suggests that she must have had such royal assent, possibly gained through her connection with the Countess de Guiche.

La Chymie Charitable et Facile, en Faveur des Dames
In either 1656 or 1666 Meurdrac published her famous treatise La Chymie Charitable et Facile, en Faveur des Dames (roughly "Useful and Easy Chemistry, for the Benefit of Ladies"). Meurdrac's treatise was one of the first works on chemistry to be written by a woman. This work went through several editions in French (1666, 1674, 1680, 1687, and 1711) and was translated into German (four editions from 1673–1712) and Italian. The work, which was approved by the regent masters of the Faculty of Medicine of Paris, focused on providing affordable treatments for the poor.

The work was divided into six parts, part 1 focusing on principles and operations, vessels, lutes, furnaces, characteristics, and weights. Part 2 was concerned with medical herbs and medicines made from such plants. Part 3 dealt with animals and part 4 with metals. Part 5 focused on making compound medicines and part 6 was directed to a female audience and covered methods of preserving and increasing beauty. Meurdrac wrote in her introduction about her methods that "I have been very careful not to go beyond my knowledge, and I can assure that everything I teach is true, and that all my remedies have been tested; for which I praise and glorify God" (translation Bishop and DeLoach, 1970). On the second page of Meurdrac's treatise are the french words "les esprits n'ont point de sexe," translated to "minds have no sex." In this time, it was not ideal for women to be scientists. Meurdrac was aware of this, making her want to prove that she could publish a textbook for women and educate them as well.  

Since the 1970s, scholars have been discussing the nature of La Chymie Charitable et Facile, en Faveur des Dames, with some arguing that it is a work on alchemy rather than chemistry. Recently, Londa Shiebinger placed Meurdrac's La Chymie in the tradition of medical cookery books. La Chymie has many similarities to the libri de segreti, medical and cosmetic books made popular in Renaissance Italy which were occasionally authored by women.

Views on gender
In addition to the importance of her work in terms of female scientific endeavors, Meurdrac has been seen by some as a proto-feminist. In her introduction, Meurdrac outlines her "inner struggle" between the contemporary female ideal, which Meurdrac described as to be "silent, listen and learn, without displaying...knowledge." However, she decides that "it would be a sin against Charity to hide the knowledge that God has given me, which may be of benefit to the world." Her eventual contribution of her works provided a foreshadowing of the paradigm shift that would later occur in the shift of alchemy to modern chemistry. Whether or not her work can be considered chemistry, Meurdrac directly contributed in a visible way that allowed for collaborative processes, and scrutiny, that would later define the field of modern chemistry and science as a whole.

From her dedication letter
"When I began this small treatise, it was for my sole satisfaction, so as not to lose memory of the knowledge that I had acquired by means of long toil, and by divers experiments repeated several times. I cannot conceal that seeing it achieved beyond what I had dared to expect, I was tempted to publish it; but if I had reason to bring it to light, I had even more reason to keep it hidden and not to expose it to general censure. . . . I dwelt irresolute in this combat almost two years. I objected to myself that teaching was not the profession of a woman; that she ought to remain in silence, to listen and to learn, without bearing witness that she knows: that it is above her to give a work to the public, and that such a reputation is not by any means advantageous. . . I prided myself that I am not the first woman to have placed something under the press, that mind has no sex, and if the minds of women were cultivated like those of men, and if we employed as much time and money in their instruction they could become their equal."

Influence
La Chymie interested Molière, and he based his comedy Les Femmes Savantes on it. The evidence given in Les Femmes Savantes backs up that Meurdrac most likely was the first woman in chemistry. This satirical play highlighted the women who devoted most of their time to experiments and academics, but it also critiques and ridicules a variety of groups, one being les femmes precieuses, which is a stereotypical group of educated women of France. However, while the play mentions subjects such as physics, mathematics, and astronomy, it does not mention chemistry. One of the reasons this satire does not include chemistry could be that Les Femmes Savantes was written in 1672, six years after the first edition of Meurdrac's La Chymie charitable and then two years before the second. This satire pushed the idea that women were not supposed to be educated, pointing out that if they were, these women were supposedly annoying and pedantic.

See also
 Timeline of women in science

References

External links
www.womenalchemists.com

1610s births
1680 deaths
French alchemists
17th-century French chemists
French women chemists
17th-century French writers
French science writers
17th-century French women scientists
17th-century alchemists
17th-century French women writers